Alfred Burchett (1831 – 12 November 1888) was an Australian cricketer. He played two first-class cricket matches for Victoria between 1858 and 1860.

See also
 List of Victoria first-class cricketers

References

1831 births
1888 deaths
Australian cricketers
Victoria cricketers
Place of birth missing
Melbourne Cricket Club cricketers